Globicornis is a genus of beetles in the family Dermestidae, the skin beetles. They are distributed throughout the world.

As of 2013 there are 27 species divided into 5 subgenera.

Species include:

 Globicornis alpina Pic, 1912
 Globicornis ambericus Háva, Prokop & Herrmann, 2006
 Globicornis antoniae Reitter, 1884
 Globicornis bifasciata Perris, 1866
 Globicornis bodemeyeri Ganglbauer in Bodemeyer, 1900
 Globicornis breviclavis Reitter in Schneider & Leder, 1878
 Globicornis cervinus Sturm, 1843
 Globicornis clavata Reitter, 1881
 Globicornis corticalis (Eichhoff, 1863)
 Globicornis depressa Mulsant & Rey, 1868
 Globicornis emarginata Gyllenhal, 1808
Globicornis emeii Háva & Kadej, 2014
 Globicornis fasciata Fairmaire & Brisout, 1859
 Globicornis kafkai Háva, 2000
 Globicornis latenotata Pic, 1915
 Globicornis longulus LeConte, 1863
Globicornis luckowi Herrmann, Háva & Kadej, 2011
 Globicornis maculatus Háva, 2004
 Globicornis mongolicus Zhantiev, 1973
 Globicornis nigripes Fabricius, 1792
 Globicornis picta Küster, 1851
 Globicornis quadriguttatus Reitter, 1878
 Globicornis quadrinaevus Reitter, 1908
 Globicornis quadripunctata Zhantiev, 1975
 Globicornis rufoguttatus Pic, 1899
 Globicornis semilimbata Pic, 1906
 Globicornis signatipennis Pic, 1899
 Globicornis stebbinsi Beal, 1954
 Globicornis sulcata Brisout de Barneville, 1866
 Globicornis tristis Reitter, 1881
 Globicornis variegata Küster, 1851
 Globicornis vaulogeri Pic, 1900

References

Dermestidae